The Moldova Billie Jean King Cup team represents Moldova in the Billie Jean King Cup tennis competition and are governed by the Moldova Republic Tennis Federation.  They have not competed since 2017.

History
Moldova competed in its first Fed Cup in 1998.  Their best result was second place in their Group II pool in 1999 and 2000.  Prior to 1993, Moldavian players represented the Soviet Union.

See also
Fed Cup
Moldova Davis Cup team

External links

Billie Jean King Cup teams
Fed Cup
Fed Cup